Jens Mansson in America (Swedish: Jens Månsson i Amerika) is a 1947 Swedish comedy film directed by Bengt Janzon and starring Edvard Persson, Stig Olin and Mim Persson.

Cast
 Edvard Persson as Jens Månsson  
 Stig Olin as Johnny Andersson  
 Mim Persson as Mim  
 Bojan Westin as Marie-Louise 
 Sven Arvor as Lawyer  
 Bertil Berglund as County constable  
 Edvard Danielsson as Bank clerk  
 Berns De Reaux as Shoeshiner  
 Cecil B. DeMille as himself 
 Erik Frank as Accordion player  
 Hortensia Hedström as Dorothy Smith  
 Kerstin Holmberg as Bank clerk  
 Björn Holmström as Detective  
 Einar Hylander as Consulate secretary in New York  
 Vincent Jonasson as Steward on Drottningholm  
 Eddy Justin as Servant  
 Virginia Kroog as Mary, Axel's housewife  
 Peder Lilliecreutz as General counselor  
 Ivar Lindahl as Swedish-American giving a ride  
 Valborg Ljungberg as Mrs. Nilsson - Jens' housemaid  
 Lorry Lorentzen as Custom official  
 Gösta Lycke as Parish constable  
 Verner Oakland as Harris  
 Otto Scheutz as Trucker giving Jens a ride  
 Per Sjöstrand as Policeman  
 Erik Söderman as Hand  
 Ernst Wellton as Policeman  
 Otto Wellton as Axel  
 Anna Westling-Leman as Stewardess 
 Carl-Johan Åbom as Consul in San Francisco

References

Bibliography 
 Qvist, Per Olov & von Bagh, Peter. Guide to the Cinema of Sweden and Finland. Greenwood Publishing Group, 2000.

External links 
 

1947 films
1947 comedy films
Swedish comedy films
1940s Swedish-language films
Swedish black-and-white films
1940s Swedish films